Tracie McGovern (born 21 April 1978 in Wauchope) is a retired Australian international football player. Tracie, also known as Trae is the Founder/ Director of The Australian Sportswoman, a website and social media platform that promotes Australian Female athletes and Sports teams. She took on this role after retiring from the Mining Industry where she was an Underground safety Adviser and Captain of the Mines Rescue squad.

References

1978 births
Living people
Australian women's soccer players
Soccer players from Sydney
Women's association football defenders
Women's association football midfielders
Sportswomen from New South Wales